This article presents a list of the historical events and publications of Australian literature during 1923.

Books 
 J. H. M. Abbott – Sydney Cove
 Marie Bjelke Petersen – Jewelled Nights
 Capel Boake — The Romany Mark
 Bernard Cronin – Salvage
 Arthur Gask – The Red Paste Murders
 Mary Gaunt – As the Whirlwind Passeth
 Nat Gould – Beating the Favourite
 D. H. Lawrence – Kangaroo
 Jack McLaren – Fagaloa's Daughter
 Catherine Martin – The Incredible Journey

Short stories
 Henry Lawson – "Elder Man's Lane : XV : The Passing of Elder Man's Lane"

Children's and Young Adult fiction 
 Mary Grant Bruce
 The Cousin from Town
 The Twins of Emu Plains
 Jean Curlewis – Beach Beyond
 May Gibbs – Nuttybub and Nittersing

Poetry 

 Emily Bulcock – Jacaranda Blooms and other poems
 Mabel Forrest – "The Burning"
 Mary Gilmore – "Second-Hand Beds"
 Jack Lindsay
 "Budding Spring"
 "Pacific Aphrodite"
 Dorothea Mackellar
 Dreamharbour and Other Verses
 "Fancy Dress"
 "Waste"
 Furnley Maurice – "The Mad Prophet"
 John Shaw Neilson – Ballad and Lyrical Poems
 Will H. Ogilvie – Scattered Scarlet
 Kenneth Slessor
 "Adventure Bay"
 "Thieves' Kitchen"

Drama 
 Katharine Susannah Prichard – The Pioneers

Non-fiction 
 Walter Murdoch – Alfred Deakin: A Sketch

Births 

 25 April – Eric Rolls, writer (died 2007) 
 21 May – Dorothy Hewett, poet and novelist (died 2002)
 4 June – Elizabeth Jolley, novelist (died 2007)
1 August – Carter Brown, novelist (died 1985)
 30 August – Charmian Clift, novelist (died 1969)
 7 September – Nancy Keesing, poet (died 1993)

Deaths 

 5 November – Dowell O'Reilly, poet (born 1865)
 15 December – Frank Morton, poet and journalist (born 1869)

See also 
 1923 in poetry
 List of years in literature
 List of years in Australian literature
1923 in literature
1922 in Australian literature
1923 in Australia
1924 in Australian literature

References

Literature
Australian literature by year
20th-century Australian literature